Joseph Louis Chipolina (born 14 December 1987) is a Gibraltar international footballer who plays for Glacis United of the Gibraltar Football League, on loan from Lincoln Red Imps as a left back or left winger.

He is his nation's third most-capped player of all time, having also played the first 27 official matches after Gibraltar were accepted into UEFA.

Club career 
Chipolina began his career with Linense of the Spanish Segunda División B and Tercera División, the third and fourth tier of the Spanish football league system respectively, between 2007 and 2012. In 2011–12, Chipolina played one season at CD San Roque of the Tercera División. In March 2012, Chipolina earned a week-long trial at Leyton Orient of England's League One.  Chipolina and San Roque terminated his contract by mutual consent in April 2012.  In total, Chipolina made 26 appearances for the club.

On 2 July 2014, Chipolina scored the first goal for a Gibraltarian club in the UEFA Champions League, with a penalty to give Lincoln Red Imps the lead over HB Tórshavn of the Faroe Islands in a 1–1 draw.

In December 2015, Chipolina was offered trials with three Scottish clubs, including Hibernian. However, the trials were cancelled at the last moment because of apparent contract complications with his club Lincoln Red Imps.

International career
Between 2007 and 2013, Chipolina appeared in seven matches for Gibraltar and scored five goals before Gibraltar applied for and was granted UEFA membership.  One of his caps came in a friendly match against England C  which garnered interest in the player from Leyton Orient and Scotland's Livingston. He was also a part of the squad that competed in the 2011 Island Games. Chipolina made history by being the first Gibraltarian player to score in an official UEFA match when he scored for the Gibraltar national futsal team in a UEFA Futsal Championship match against Montenegro in 2013.

After Gibraltar was accepted as a member of UEFA, Chipolina was selected as part of the 23-man squad for Gibraltar's official debut against Slovakia on 19 November 2013. Chipolina made his international debut in the match, a start in the eventual 0–0 draw. He played in every one of Gibraltar's games from 19 November 2013 until 3 September 2017, but was left out of the senior squad announcement on 28 September 2017 to face Estonia and Greece national football team. On 13 October 2018, Chipolina scored the only goal from the penalty spot as Gibraltar recorded their first competitive win in a 1–0 victory over Armenia in the 2018–19 UEFA Nations League.  He was on the scoresheet again three days later, heading the winner as Gibraltar came from behind to beat Liechtenstein 2–1.

International goals for Gibraltar XI
Scores and results list Gibraltar's goal tally first.

International goals for Gibraltar
Scores and results list Gibraltar's goal tally first.

|-
!scope=row|
| 13 October 2018 || Vazgen Sargsyan Republican Stadium, Yerevan, Armenia ||  ||  ||  || rowspan=2 |  2018–19 UEFA Nations League D
|-
!scope=row|
| 16 October 2018 || Victoria Stadium, Gibraltar ||  ||  || 
|}

International career statistics

Personal life
Chipolina works as a Prison Officer in Gibraltar. He is the older brother of Kenneth Chipolina who also plays for the Gibraltar national football team and cousin of Roy Chipolina.

References

External links

1987 births
Living people
Gibraltarian footballers
Gibraltar international footballers
Gibraltarian expatriate footballers
Association football forwards
Segunda División B players
Tercera División players
Real Balompédica Linense footballers
CD San Roque footballers
Real Colorado Foxes players
St Joseph's F.C. players
Lincoln Red Imps F.C. players
Gibraltarian expatriate sportspeople in Spain
Expatriate soccer players in the United States
Gibraltar Premier Division players
Gibraltar pre-UEFA international footballers
Gibraltarian expatriate sportspeople in the United States
Expatriate footballers in Spain